The Vicksburg Theatre Guild is a community theater troupe in Vicksburg, Mississippi, USA.  Chartered in 1936, it is the oldest community theater in the state.  It is also the current home of the Guinness Book of World Records' longest running show, Gold in the Hills.

Each year, the Main Stage Productions offers four or five plays or musicals. 

Gold in the Hills takes place in April and July.  

Fairy Tale Theatre is a summer children’s education production with performances in late June.

External links
Vicksburg Theatre Guild Homepage
Gold in the Hills Homepage

References
Vicksburg Theatre Guild Homepage
Gold in the Hills Homepage

Community theatre
Vicksburg, Mississippi
Theatre in Mississippi
Tourist attractions in Warren County, Mississippi